The 68th district of the Texas House of Representatives contains the entirety of Shackelford, Throckmorton, and Young Counties. The current Representative is David Spiller, who was first elected in 2020.

References 

68